Bald Mound is an unincorporated community in Blackberry Township, Kane County, Illinois, United States, located at the junction of County Routes 10 and 78,  west of Batavia. The Stearns-Wadsworth House, which is listed on the National Register of Historic Places, is located in Bald Mound.

References

Unincorporated communities in Kane County, Illinois
Unincorporated communities in Illinois
Chicago metropolitan area